Mauro Irinardo Caballero, known as Nayo, is a Honduran retired football forward who played for C.D. Marathón.

Club career
Nicknamed Nayo, Caballero played his entire career for Marathón. He was member of La Trinca Infernal (The Infernal Lashing) along with his brother Mario Caballero and Julio César Fonseca.

He scored a total of 42 goals for Marathón in Liga Nacional and was the top scorer of 1966-67 season with 12 goals.

References

Living people
C.D. Marathón players
Honduran footballers
Association football forwards
Year of birth missing (living people)